The Woolwich Formation is a geological formation in southeast England. It preserves fossils dating back to the Paleogene period.

See also

 List of fossiliferous stratigraphic units in England

References

 

Paleogene England